This is a list of members of the Northern Territory Legislative Assembly from 2005 to 2008:

 Stuart Labor MLA and territory Attorney-General Peter Toyne resigned in late August 2006. Labor candidate Karl Hampton won the resulting by-election on 23 October.
 Greatorex CLP MLA Dr Richard Lim resigned on 9 July 2007. CLP candidate Matt Conlan won the resulting by-election on 28 July.
 The MLA for Arafura was elected under the name of Barbara McCarthy, but legally adopted her traditional name of Malarndirri in September 2007. She henceforth requested to be addressed as Malarndirri McCarthy.

See also
2005 Northern Territory general election

Members of Northern Territory parliaments by term
21st-century Australian politicians